Edgewood State Hospital was a tubercular/psychiatric hospital complex that formerly stood in Deer Park, New York, on Long Island.  It was one of four state mental asylums built on Long Island (the others being Kings Park State Hospital, Central Islip State Hospital, and Pilgrim State Hospital), and was the last one of the four to be built.

History
The hospital was built in the early 1940s, believed to be a Works Progress Administration-funded project.  It consisted only of ten buildings (including its massive, prominent 13-story main building), making it the smallest of the four as well (although it was planned to be a larger complex, those plans never made it past paper).  The facility was commandeered by the War Department after the United States entered World War II.  The War Department completed its construction for use as a psychiatric facility for battle-traumatized soldiers.  Its entire campus (in addition to three buildings from nearby Pilgrim State Hospital and numerous temporary structures) was used as "Mason General Hospital" by the department.

When the war ended, the hospital was transferred back to New York State, where it essentially operated as the tubercular division of Pilgrim for a few years. In 1946 film director John Huston was assigned by the U.S. government to film a documentary film about recovering soldiers in the hospital for propaganda purposes, the film was called Let There Be Light.

Advancements in medicine throughout the 1950s and 1960s that offered alternatives to institutionalization led to decentralization, and the hospital closed in 1971.  From that point on it was left to the mercy of vandals, arsonists and time.  Its main building and a handful of other structures were demolished in stages throughout 1989.  The final remaining structures were disposed of around 1990–91.

Today, the site sits as an open, state-protected oak-brush plains preserve under the NYS DEC department. One can still find remnants of the former hospital, such as the old rail spur, fire hydrants, etc., scattered about.  People can obtain a free DEC permit for access to the preserve.  Activities include hiking, biking, dog training, and model airplane flying.

References

Hospitals established in the 1940s
1971 disestablishments in New York (state)
Babylon (town), New York
Psychiatric hospitals in New York (state)
Tuberculosis sanatoria in the United States
Defunct hospitals in New York (state)
Demolished buildings and structures in New York (state)
Works Progress Administration in New York (state)
Protected areas of Suffolk County, New York